This is a list of all current heads of member institutions and central academic bodies of the University of London.

Heads of member institutions
Master, Birkbeck
David Latchman

President, City, University of London
 Sir Paul Curran

Director, Courtauld Institute of Art
Deborah Swallow

Warden, Goldsmiths'
Pat Loughrey

Chief Executive and President, Institute of Cancer Research
Alan Ashworth

President and Principal, King's College London
Ed Byrne AC

Dean, London Business School
Sir Andrew Likierman

Director, London School of Economics and Political Science
Craig Calhoun

Director, London School of Hygiene & Tropical Medicine
Peter Piot

Principal, Queen Mary 
Simon Gaskell

Principal, Royal Academy of Music
Jonathan Freeman-Attwood

Principal, Royal Central School of Speech and Drama
 Gavin Henderson CBE

Principal, Royal Holloway
Paul Layzell

Principal, Royal Veterinary College
Stuart Reid

Principal, St George’s
Peter Kopelman

Director and Principal, School of Oriental and African Studies
Adam Habib

Principal and Dean, The School of Pharmacy
Anthony Smith

President and Provost, University College London
 Malcolm Grant CBE

Heads of central academic bodies

Dean, School of Advanced Study
 Roger Kain CBE FBA

Dean, University of London International Programmes
Jonathan Kydd

Dean, University of London Institute in Paris
Andrew Hussey

Director, University Marine Biological Station, Millport
 Jim Atkinson

Heads of colleges
London education-related lists